The Xico Andebol is a Portuguese handball team based in Guimarães, which plays in the top tier domestic league, the Andebol 1. It is the successor of Desportivo Francisco Holanda.

References

Portuguese handball clubs
Handball clubs established in 2009
2009 establishments in Portugal